Muhlenbergia orophila is a grass species native to Guatemala and to Mexico as far north as the Distrito Federal. The type specimen was collected from an alpine meadow at an elevation of approximately 3750 m (12,500 feet) near the Summit of Sierra de las Cuchumantanes, a remote mountainous area in el Departamento de Huehuetenango in the western part of Guatemala.

Muhlenbergia orophila is a perennial herb growing in clumps. Stems can reach up to 25 cm (10 inches) tall. Sheaths are longer than the internodes. Leaves are long and narrow, up to 8 cm (3.2 inches) long and 1.5 mm (0.06 inches) wide. Spikelets are born in paniculate arrays up to 8 cm (3.2 inches) long partly enclosed in the subtending sheath, each spike dark purple and up to 3.5 mm (0.14 inches) long not including the awn that can be up to 1 mm (0.04 inches) long.

References

orophila
Flora of Guatemala
Flora of Mexico